Kim Se-yun (born 29 April 1999) is a South Korean footballer currently playing as a forward for Gyeongnam FC.

Career statistics

Club

Honours

International

South Korea U20
FIFA U-20 World Cup runner-up: 2019

References

External links 
 

1999 births
Living people
South Korean footballers
Association football forwards
K League 2 players
Daejeon Hana Citizen FC players
Gyeongnam FC players
Sportspeople from Daegu
South Korea under-20 international footballers